Blue is an album by guitarist Terje Rypdal and The Chasers, bassist Bjørn Kjellemyr and drummer Audun Kleive, recorded in 1986 and released on the ECM label.

Reception
The Allmusic review by Thom Jurek awarded the album 4½ stars stating "One of the primary attributes of Blue is its sequencing; the entire recording seems to unfold endlessly and seamlessly. Nothing is rushed, and all parts and players contribute economically. The band establishes a textural point of view to improvise from in every selection, and doesn't seem to be hindered by the guitar-bass-drums limitation. Each track appears to reveal itself as a sound world, full of possibility and limitless space, giving the band a chance to offer itself to these compositions rather than just play them".

Track listing
All compositions by Terje Rypdal except as indicated
 "The Curse" - 1:26 
 Kompet Går" (Bjørn Kjellemyr, Audun Kleive, Terje Rypdal) - 6:52 
 "I Disremember Quite Well" - 5:06 
 "Og Hva Synes VI Om Det" (Kjellemyr, Kleive, Rypdal) - 5:53 
 "Last Nite" - 3:30 
 "Blue" - 5:43 
 "Tanga" - 4:18 
 "Om Bare" - 3:03 
Recorded at Rainbow Studio in Oslo, Norway in November 1986

Personnel
Terje Rypdal — electric guitar, keyboards 
Bjørn Kjellemyr — acoustic bass, electric bass
Audun Kleive — drums, percussion

References

ECM Records albums
Terje Rypdal albums
1987 albums
Albums produced by Manfred Eicher